McGuffin is a surname of Irish origin, thought to originate from County Donegal. It is an Anglicized form of  the Gaelic Mag Dhuibhfinn.  Notable people with the surname include:

Meg McGuffin (born c. 1990), American beauty-pageant titleholder
David McGuffin (fl. 2000s), Canadian television correspondent
Gary and Joanie McGuffin (born 1959, born 1960), Canadian explorers, authors, and conservation photographer
Peter McGuffin (born 1949), Northern Irish geneticist
Samuel McGuffin (1863–1952), Northern Ireland politician